The  (lit. the department of the inner (or privy) affairs) was a division of the eighth century Japanese government of the Imperial Court in Kyoto, instituted in the Asuka period and formalized during the Heian period.  The Ministry was replaced in the Meiji period.

Overview
This ministry encompassed those of the Imperial Household whose functions brought them closest to the emperor. The ceremonies of the Imperial Household evolved over time.  Among those holding the highest office in the Imperial Household ministry was Takaharu-shinnō, who would later become Emperor Go-Daigo.

History
The ceremonial nature of the Imperial Household has changed over time.  The Ministry was established in 649 as a liaison between the Daijō-kan and the Emperor.

The ambit of the Ministry's activities encompasses, for example:
 attendance upon the Emperor, including advice to him on his personal matters, supporting him in the maintenance of a proper dignity and helping him in the observance of proper forms of etiquette 
 assisting in the inspection and countersigning of drafts of Imperial Rescripts
 making of representations to the Emperor
 support in the issuance of imperial orders in time of war
 monitoring the reception of addresses to the Emperor
 compilation of the history of the country
 maintenance of the records relating to the gazetteer
 maintenance of the records relating to the personal status of imperial princesses from the second to the fourth generation
 maintenance of the records relating to the maids of honour and other court ladies
 oversight of the submission to the Emperor of the census of the population in the various provinces 
 oversight of the submission to the Emperor of the accounts of the taxes to be levied
 oversight of the submission to the Emperor of the lists of the priests and nuns in the provinces
 assistance relating to the Grand Empress Dowager, the Empress Dowager, and the Empress
 supervision of the Imperial archives
 administration of the annual expenditure of the court and to various articles to be provided for the use of the Imperial family
 supervision of the astronomical calculations and the arrangement of the calendar
 oversight of the pictorial artists at court
 regulation of medicaments to be supplied to the Emperor and the medical advice to be given him
 maintenance of order in the palace

Hierarchy
Amongst the significant Daijō-kan officials within this ministry structure were:
 . After the 11th century, this position in the Imperial court was always an Imperial prince.  This official oversees the inspection of the interior apartments of the palace; and he is granted the privilege of retaining his swords in the presence of the emperor.
 .
 .
 .
 .
 , 8 positions.  There are 8 officials with this title, all equal in rank and in the confidence of the Emperor.
 , 90 positions.  There are 90 officials with this title; and when a sesshō becomes a kampaku, these men function under his orders.  If the emperor is still a child, or if a woman occupies the throne, a sessho is chosen to represent the emperor; and the kampaku is considered first amongst all others in Japan.  Then the Shōgun cannot undertake anything of importance without his approval.  When the emperor governs directly on his own, the Udoneri may be by-passed.
 .
  .  These officials must be very well versed in the affairs of China and Japan: and they edit or re-draft all of the emperor's edicts, rescripts, memorials and letters.  For this kind of work, only men of the highest merit and distinction are chosen.
 .
 .
 .
 .
 .
 .
 .
  -- see Onmyōdō.
 .
 .
 .
 .

In the Meiji period, a variant equerry was introduced as part of the Imperial retinue.  As explained in an excerpt from the :
" will perform attendant duties and will relay to him military matters and orders, be present at military reviews [in his name] and accompanying him to formal ceremonies and interviews."

See also
 Daijō-kan

Notes

References
 Kawakami, Karl Kiyoshi. (1903). The Political Ideas of the Modern Japan.  Iowa City, Iowa: University of Iowa Press. OCLC 466275784.   Internet Archive, full text
 Nussbaum, Louis Frédéric and Käthe Roth. (2005). Japan Encyclopedia. Cambridge: Harvard University Press. ; OCLC 48943301
 Titsingh, Isaac. (1834). Nihon Odai Ichiran; ou,  Annales des empereurs du Japon.  Paris: Royal Asiatic Society, Oriental Translation Fund of Great Britain and Ireland.  OCLC 5850691
 Ponsonby-Fane, Richard Arthur Brabazon. (1959).  The Imperial House of Japan. Kyoto: Ponsonby Memorial Society. OCLC 194887
 Varley, H. Paul. (1980).  Jinnō Shōtōki: A Chronicle of Gods and Sovereigns. New York: Columbia University Press. ;  OCLC 59145842

Government of feudal Japan
Meiji Restoration
Center